Sardis was the capital of the ancient kingdom of Lydia, in present-day Turkey.

Sardis may also refer to:

Places

Canada
Sardis, Chilliwack, a neighbourhood within the City of Chilliwack

United States
Sardis, Alabama, an unincorporated community
Sardis City, Alabama
Sardis, Arkansas, an unincorporated community
Sardis, Georgia, a town
Sardis, Kentucky, a city
Sardis, Mississippi, a town
Sardis, Ohio, a census-designated place
Sardis, Oklahoma, a community
Sardis, Pennsylvania, populated place within the Municipality of Murrysville, PA
Sardis, Tennessee, a town
Sardis, West Virginia, an unincorporated community
Sardis Lake (Mississippi)
Sardis Lake (Oklahoma)

Wales
Sardis, southeast Pembrokeshire, a village in southeast Pembrokeshire
Sardis, south Pembrokeshire, a village in south Pembrokeshire

In religion
See of Sardis, an episcopal see
Sardis Synagogue, Turkey
Sardis Baptist Church (disambiguation), several churches in the US
Sardis Methodist Church, Sparkman, Arkansas
Sardis Presbyterian Church and Cemetery, Coosa, Georgia

See also
Sardi (disambiguation)
Sardi's restaurant